Lenarduzzi is an Italian surname. Notable people with the surname include:

Bob Lenarduzzi (born 1955), Canadian soccer player
Sam Lenarduzzi (born 1949), Canadian soccer player
Rhys Lenarduzzi (born 1990), Australian rugby player
Mike Lenarduzzi, Canadian ice hockey player

Italian-language surnames